The draugr or draug (plural ; modern ,  and Danish, Swedish, and ) is an undead creature from the Scandinavian saga literature and folktales.

Overview 
Draugar live in their graves or royal palaces, often guarding treasure buried with them in their burial mound. They are revenants, or animated corpses with a corporeal body, rather than ghosts which possess intangible spiritual bodies.

Terminology 
Old Norse  is defined as "a ghost, spirit, esp. the dead inhabitant of a cairn". Often the draugr is regarded not so much as a ghost but a revenant, i.e., the reanimated corpse of the deceased inside the burial mound (as in the example of Kárr inn gamli in Grettis saga).

Cognates and etymology 
In Swedish, draug is a modern loanword from West Norse, as the native Swedish form drög has acquired the meaning of "a pale, ineffectual, and slow-minded person that drags himself along". 

The word is hypothetically traced to Proto-Indo European stem * "phantom", from * "deceive" (see also Avestan "druj").

Broadened usage 

Unlike Kárr inn gamli (Kar the Old) in Grettis saga, who is specifically called a draugr, Glámr the ghost in the same saga is never explicitly called a draugr in the text, though called a "troll" in it. Yet Glámr is still routinely referred to as a draugr.

A further caveat is that the application of the term draugr may not necessarily follow what the term might have meant in the strict sense during medieval times, but rather follow a modern definition or notion of draugr, specifically such ghostly beings (by whatever names they are called) that occur in Icelandic folktales categorized as "Draugasögur" in Jón Árnason's collection, based on the classification groundwork laid by Konrad Maurer.

Overall classification 
Ghost with physical body
The draugr is a "corporeal ghost" with a physical tangible body and not an "imago", and in tales it is often delivered a "second death" by destruction of the enlivened corpse.

Vampire
The draugr has also been conceived of as a type of "vampire" by folktale anthologist Andrew Lang in late 1897, with the idea further pursued by more modern commentators. The focus here is not on blood-sucking, which is not attested for the draugr, but rather, contagiousness or transmittable nature of vampirism,  that is to say, how a vampire begets another by turning his or her attack victim into one of his own kind. Sometimes the chain of contagion becomes an outbreak, e.g., the case of Þórólfr bægifótr (Thorolf Lame-foot or Twist-Foot), and even called an "epidemic" regarding Þórgunna (Thorgunna).

A more speculative case of vampirism is that of Glámr, who was asked to tend sheep for a haunted farmstead and was subsequently found dead with his neck and every bone in his body broken. It has been surmised by commentators that Glámr by "contamination" was turned into an undead (draugr) by whatever being was haunting the farm.

Physical traits 
Draugar usually possessed superhuman strength, and were "generally hideous to look at", bearing a necrotic black or blue color, and were associated with a "reek of decay" or more precisely inhabited haunts that often issued foul stench. 

The draugar were said to be either hel-blár ("death-blue") or nár-fölr ("corpse-pale"). Glámr when found dead was described as "blár sem Hel en digr sem naut (black as hell and bloated to the size of a bull)". Þórólfr Lame-foot, when lying dormant, looked "uncorrupted" and also "was black as death [i.e., bruised black and blue] and swollen to the size of an ox". The close similarity of these descriptions have been noted. Laxdæla saga describes how bones were dug up belonging to a dead sorceress who had appeared in dreams, and they were "blue and evil looking".

Þráinn (Thrain) the berserker of Valland "turned himself into a troll" in Hrómundar saga Gripssonar was a fiend (dólgr) which was "black and huge.. roaring loudly and blowing fire", and moreover, possessed long scratching claws, and the claws stuck in the neck, prompting the hero Hrómundr to refer to the dragur as a sort of cat.
 The possession of long claws features also in the case of another revenant, Ásviðr (Aswitus) who came to life in the night and attacked his foster-brother Ásmundr (Asmundus) with them, scratching his face and tearing one of his ears.

Draugrs often give off a morbid stench, not unlike the smell of a decaying body. The mound where Kárr the Old was entombed reeked horribly. In Harðar saga Hörðr Grímkelsson’s two underlings die even before entering Sóti the Viking's mound, due to the "gust and stink" wafting out of it.  When enraged Þráinn filled the barrow with an "evil reek."

Magical abilities 
Draugar are noted for having numerous magical abilities (referred to as trollskap) resembling those of living witches and wizards, such as shape-shifting, controlling the weather, and seeing into the future.

Shape-shifting 

The undead Víga-Hrappr Sumarliðason (Killer-Hrapp) of Laxdaela saga, unlike the typical guardian of a treasure hoard, does not stay put in his burial place but roams around his farmstead of Hrappstaðir, menacing the living. Víga-Hrappr's ghost, it has been suggested, was capable of transforming into the seal with human-like eyes which appeared before Þorsteinn svarti/surt (Thorsteinn the Black) sailing by ship, and was responsible for the sinking of the ship to prevent the family from reaching Hrappstaðir. The ability to shape-shift has been ascribed to Icelandic ghosts generally, particularly into the shape of a seal.

A draugr in Icelandic folktales collected in the modern age can also change into a great flayed bull, a grey horse with a broken back but no ears or tail, and a cat that would sit upon a sleeper's chest and grow steadily heavier until their victim suffocated.

Other magical abilities 

Draugar have the ability to enter into the dreams of the living, and they will frequently leave a gift behind so that "the living person may be assured of the tangible nature of the visit".  Draugar also have the ability to curse a victim, as shown in the Grettis saga, where Grettir is cursed to be unable to become any stronger. Draugar also brought disease to a village and could create temporary darkness in daylight hours. They preferred to be active during the night, although they did not appear to be vulnerable to sunlight like some other revenants. Draugr can also kill people with bad luck.

A draugr's presence might be shown by a great light that glowed from the mound like foxfire. This fire would form a barrier between the land of the living and the land of the dead. 

The undead Víga-Hrappr exhibited the ability to sink into the ground to escape from Óláfr Hǫskuldsson the Peacock.

Some draugar are immune to weapons, and only a hero has the strength and courage needed to stand up to so formidable an opponent. In legends, the hero would often have to wrestle the draugr back to his grave, thereby defeating him, since weapons would do no good. A good example of this is found in Hrómundar saga Gripssonar. Iron could injure a draugr, as is the case with many supernatural creatures, although it would not be sufficient to stop it. Sometimes the hero is required to dispose of the body in unconventional ways. The preferred method is to cut off the draugr's head, burn the body, and dump the ashes in the sea—the emphasis being on making absolutely sure that the draugr was dead and gone.

Behaviour and character 
Any mean, nasty, or greedy person can become a draugr. As Ármann Jakobsson notes, "most medieval Icelandic ghosts are evil or marginal people. If not dissatisfied or evil, they are unpopular".

Greed 
The draugr's motivation was primarily envy and greed. Greed causes it to viciously attack any would-be grave robbers, but the draugr also expresses an innate envy of the living stemming from a longing for the things of life which it once had. They also exhibit an immense and nearly insatiable appetite, as shown in the encounter of Aran and Asmund, sword brothers who made an oath that, if one should die, the other would sit vigil with him for three days inside the burial mound. When Aran died, Asmund brought his own possessions into the barrow—banners, armor, hawk, hound, and horse—then set himself to wait the three days:

Bloodthirst 
The draugr's victims were not limited to trespassers in its home. The roaming undead devastated livestock by running the animals to death either by riding them or pursuing them in some hideous, half-flayed form. Shepherds' duties kept them outdoors at night, and they were particular targets for the hunger and hatred of the undead:

Animals feeding near the grave of a draugr might be driven mad by the creature's influence. They may also die from being driven mad. Thorolf, for example, caused birds to drop dead when they flew over his bowl barrow.

Sitting posture and evil eye 
The main indication that a deceased person will become a draugr is that the corpse is not in a horizontal position but is found standing upright (Víga-Hrappr), or in a sitting position (Þórólfr), indicating that the dead might return. Ármann Jakobsson suggests further that breaking the draugr's posture is a necessary or helpful step in destroying the draugr, but this is fraught with the risk of being inflicted with the evil eye, whether this is explictly told in the case of Grettir who receives the curse from Glámr, or only implied in the case of Þórólfr, whose son warns the others to beware while they unbend Þórólfr's seated posture.

Annihilating 
The revenant draugr needing to be decapitated in order to incapacitate them from further hauntings is a common theme in the family sagas.

Means of prevention 

Traditionally, a pair of open iron scissors was placed on the chest of the recently deceased, and straws or twigs might be hidden among their clothes. The big toes were tied together or needles were driven through the soles of the feet in order to keep the dead from being able to walk. Tradition also held that the coffin should be lifted and lowered in three different directions as it was carried from the house to confuse a possible draugr's sense of direction.

The most effective means of preventing the return of the dead was believed to be a corpse door, a special door through which the corpse was carried feet-first with people surrounding it so that the corpse couldn't see where it was going. The door was then bricked up to prevent a return. It is speculated that this belief began in Denmark and spread throughout the Norse culture, founded on the idea that the dead could only leave through the way they entered.

In Eyrbyggja saga, draugar are driven off by holding a "door-doom". One by one, they are summoned to the door-doom and given judgment and forced out of the home by this legal method. The home was then purified with holy water to ensure that they never came back.

Similar beings 
A variation of the draugr is the haugbui (from Old Norse haugr''' "howe, barrow, tumulus") which was a mound-dweller, the dead body living on within its tomb. The notable difference between the two was that the haugbui is unable to leave its grave site and only attacks those who trespass upon their territory.

The haugbui was rarely found far from its burial place and is a type of undead commonly found in Norse sagas. The creature is said to either swim alongside boats or sail around them in a partially submerged vessel, always on their own. In some accounts, witnesses portray them as shapeshifters who take on the appearance of seaweed or moss-covered stones on the shoreline.

 Folklore 
Icelandic Sagas
One of the best-known draugar is Glámr, who is defeated by the hero in Grettis saga. After Glámr dies on Christmas Eve, "people became aware that Glámr was not resting in peace. He wrought such havoc that some people fainted at the sight of him, while others went out of their minds". After a battle, Grettir eventually gets Glámr on his back. Just before Grettir kills him, Glámr curses Grettir because "Glámr was endowed with more evil force than most other ghosts", and thus he was able to speak and leave Grettir with his curse after his death.

A somewhat ambivalent, alternative view of the draugr is presented by the example of Gunnar Hámundarson in Njáls saga: "It seemed as though the howe was agape, and that Gunnar had turned within the howe to look upwards at the moon. They thought that they saw four lights within the howe, but not a shadow to be seen. Then they saw that Gunnar was merry, with a joyful face."

In the Eyrbyggja saga, a shepherd is assaulted by a blue-black draugr. The shepherd's neck is broken during the ensuing scuffle. The shepherd rises the next night as a draugr.

Recent

In more recent Scandinavian folklore, the draug (the modern spelling used in Denmark, Norway, and Sweden) is a supernatural being that occurs in legends along the coast of Norway. Draugen was originally a dead person who either lived in the mound (in Norse called haugbúi) or went out to haunt the living. In later folklore, it became common to limit the figure to a ghost of a dead fisherman who had drifted at sea, and who was not buried in Christian soil. It was said that he wore a leather jacket or was dressed in oilskin, but had a seaweed vase for his head. He sailed in a half-boat with blocked sails (the Norwegian municipality of Bø, Nordland has the half-boat in its coat-of-arms) and announced death for those who saw him or even wanted to pull them down. This trait is common in the northernmost part of Norway, where life and culture was based on fishing more than anywhere else. The reason for this may be that the fishermen often drowned in great numbers, and the stories of restless dead coming in from sea were more common in the north than any other region of the country.

A recorded legend from Trøndelag tells how a cadaver lying on a beach became the object of a quarrel between the two types of draug (headless and seaweed-headed). A similar source even tells of a third type, the gleip, known to hitch themselves to sailors walking ashore and make them slip on the wet rocks.

But, though the draug usually presages death, there is an amusing account in Northern Norway of a northerner who managed to outwit him:

Use in popular culture
The modern and popular connection between the draug and the sea can be traced back to authors like Jonas Lie and Regine Nordmann, whose works include several books of fairy tales, as well as the drawings of Theodor Kittelsen, who spent some years living in Svolvær. Up north, the tradition of sea-draugs is especially vivid.

Arne Garborg describes land-draugs coming fresh from the graveyards, and the term draug is even used of vampires. The notion of draugs who live in the mountains is present in the poetic works of Henrik Ibsen (Peer Gynt), and Aasmund Olavsson Vinje. The Nynorsk translation of The Lord of the Rings used the term for both Nazgûl and the dead men of Dunharrow. Tolkien's barrow-wights bear obvious similarity to, and were inspired by the haugbúi.

In The Elder Scrolls video game series, draugr are the undead mummified corpses of fallen warriors that inhabit the ancient burial sites of a Nordic-inspired race of man. These draugr behave more like haugbúi than traditional draugr. They first appeared in the Bloodmoon expansion to The Elder Scrolls III: Morrowind, and would later go on to appear all throughout The Elder Scrolls V: Skyrim. Draugr are a common enemy, the first encountered by the player, in the 2018 video game God of War, with a variety of different powers and abilities. In 2019, a spaceship named Draugur was added to the game Eve Online, as the command destroyer of the Triglavian faction. Draugr appear as an enemies in the 2021 early access game Valheim, where they take the more recent, seaweed version of the Draug.

In Draug (film), a group of viking warriors encounter the draugr while searching for a missing person inside a huge forest. The draugr are depicted as blue-black animated corpses wielding many magical abilities.

In the movie The Northman, Amleth enters a burial mound, in search of a magical sword named "Draugr". Inside the grave chamber Amleth encounters an undead Mound Dweller (draugr), who he has to fight in order to obtain the blade.

Season two episode two of Hilda'', entitled "The Draugen," involved draugen as the ghosts of sailors who died at sea. While their form was ghostly, the captain was able to wear a coat, and had a shock of seaweed for hair.

The exoplanet PSR B1257+12 A has been named "Draugr".

See also
 Gjenganger
 Norse funeral
 Selkolla
 Spriggan
 Wiedergänger

Explanatory notes

References

Citations

General and cited references

Primary sources

Secondary sources 

 
 
 
 
 
 
 
 
 
 
 
 
 
 

Creatures in Norse mythology
Corporeal undead
Circumpolar mythology
Ghouls
Icelandic folklore
Scandinavian folklore
Scandinavian legendary creatures
Undead
Vampires
Zombies